The Marshall Square Historic District encompasses a collection of sixteen nearly identical houses in Little Rock, Arkansas.  The houses are set on 17th (south side) and 18th (north side) Streets between McAlmont and Vance Streets, and were built in 1917-18 as rental properties Josephus C. Marshall.  All are single-story wood-frame structures, with hip roofs and projecting front gables, and are built to essentially identical floor plans.  They exhibit only minor variations, in the placement of porches and dormers, and in the type of fenestration.

The district was listed on the National Register of Historic Places in 1979.

See also
National Register of Historic Places listings in Little Rock, Arkansas

References

Historic districts on the National Register of Historic Places in Arkansas
Victorian architecture in Arkansas
Buildings and structures completed in 1917
Buildings and structures in Little Rock, Arkansas
National Register of Historic Places in Little Rock, Arkansas